Richard Donald (or variants) may refer to:

Richard Atley Donald, baseball player
Dick Donald, footballer and businessman
Richard H. Donald, ambassador
Rick Donald, Australian actor

See also